Turkey have participated at five UEFA European Championships so far; the first finals they qualified for was Euro 1996. Their best European performance to date was reaching the semi-finals in 2008, after winning their quarter-final match against Croatia on penalties.

Euro 1996

Group stage

Euro 2000

Group stage

Knockout stage

Quarter-finals

Euro 2008

Group stage

Knockout phase

Quarter-finals

Semi-finals

Euro 2016

Group stage

Ranking of third-placed teams

Euro 2020

Group stage

Overall record

*Denotes draws including knockout matches decided via penalty shoot-out.

Notes

References

Countries at the UEFA European Championship
Turkey at the UEFA European Championship